Rune Velta (born 19 July 1989) is a Norwegian former ski jumper.

Career
On 25 February 2012, Velta finished second in the Ski Flying World Championships in Vikersund, behind winner Robert Kranjec. He made his World Cup debut in March 2010 in Oslo, where he finished 43rd. The week before he had recorded his best placements in the Continental Cup, with a sixth and a fifth place in the same city. He first finished among the top 30 in the World Cup with a 17th place from December 2010 in Lillehammer. This was followed by 10th place the next day.

He hails from Bærums Verk, and represents Lommedalens IL.

References

1989 births
Living people
Sportspeople from Bærum
Norwegian male ski jumpers
Ski jumpers at the 2014 Winter Olympics
Olympic ski jumpers of Norway
FIS Nordic World Ski Championships medalists in ski jumping
21st-century Norwegian people